Rhodesia Railways class DE2 are a type of diesel locomotive built for operations on Rhodesia Railways in the 1950s. The first entered service on 22 June 1955. 

All were built in England in two batches by English Electric; 1200 to 1222 at Dick, Kerr & Company in Preston and 1223–1234 at Vulcan Foundry, Newton-le-Willows in 1958.

Description
The locomotive has the 1Co-Co1 wheel arrangement and is carried on two cast steel bogies, each having three driving axles guided at the outer end by a Bissel truck.

The locomotive superstructure has a semi-streamlined appearance with a cab behind each nose end compartment. Between the two cabs is the engine compartment, within which the radiators, the power unit and the control cubicle are mounted. The radiators for the cooling water and lubricating oil are located one on each side of the locomotive and are cooled by a roof mounted fan, driven directly from the engine through cardan shafts and a gearbox. The power unit is adjacent to the radiators and behind it is the control cubicle. On either side of the control cubicle are the battery boxes, at floor level. Above the batteries are the engine room ventilation fans with their associated filter units. Access to the engine compartment is through doors in each cab bulkhead and through a door on each side of the superstructure.

The driving cabs have large front windows and full-drop side windows and an entrance door is provided at each side of the cab. Upholstered fully adjustable seats are provided for the driver and assistant, the driving position being on the right hand side of the cab. The controller, brake valves and instruments are located at the driving position and a vigilance control is fitted. Warning lights are also provided to indicate wheel slip, blower motor failure, low oil pressure and high water temperature. A speedometer is fitted in both cabs and a speed recorder in one cab.

Each of the nose end compartments contains a motor driven exhauster, a motor driven compressor and a motor driven traction motor blower.
The locomotive underframe is an all-welded structure made up from rolled steel sections and plates: a truss framework is built on the underframe up to cantrail level to give additional stiffening to the whole assembly. The whole structure is strongly cross-braced and includes a cowcatcher and automatic coupler at each end. Incorporated in the underframe is the fuel oil tank which has a capacity of 1,000 gal.

The roof over the engine compartment can be removed as a complete unit to facilitate overhaul. Two hatches are provided in the roof for direct access to the cylinder heads: in addition hatches are provided over the control frame and turbochargers.

The bogies are of the cast steel type. Roller bearing axleboxes are fitted throughout: those on the Bissel truck are of the cannon box type. The main springs over the axleboxes are of the laminated type and are fitted with auxiliary coil springs. The riding qualities of the locomotive are further improved by each bogie having three spring groups comprising, firstly the Bissel truck axle and the adjacent motored axle and secondly, the springs of the remaining two wheels on each side.

Air brakes are provided and provision is made for braking vacuum fitted stock. Service braking is controlled from the driver's vacuum brake valve which operates the vacuum brakes on the train and. through a proportional valve, the air brakes on the locomotive. The air brakes on the locomotive can be separately controlled by means of the driver's independent air brake valve. A hand brake in each cab operates the brakes of the adjacent bogie.

The diesel engine prime mover originally fitted was the EE 16SVT, a medium-speed V16 engine. Similar engines were being used for locomotives built in the same works for British Railways. Eight locomotives were later fitted with identical overhauled ex-British Rail Class 40 engines. The main generator is bolted solidly to the engine bedplate and crankcase to form a compact and rigid unit and the auxiliary generator is overhung on the free end of the main generator. The power unit as a whole is mounted on a four-point resilient suspension. The engine is started by motoring the main generator from the battery, the generator having a special winding. The locomotive output is controlled by varying the speed of the diesel engine and the field strength of the main generator. The method of control is such that the load imposed on the engine is automatically adjusted to coincide with the available engine horse-power, irrespective of engine or locomotive speed.

The control cubicle contains all the control equipment with the exception of the main and auxiliary generator field resistances and the traction motor field divert resistances. It is provided with removable dust-tight covers to facilitate maintenance.

The main generator supplies current to the six traction motors which are connected in three parallel groups, each group consisting of two motors in series. The auxiliary generator supplies direct current for the auxiliary machines and battery charging. The auxiliary machines which are motor driven include two exhausters, two compressors, two traction motor blowers, and two ventilating fan motors. They are fitted for multiple unit operation.

Preservation
Class leader 1200 is now preserved in the Bulawayo Railway Museum, and 1207 at Sandstone Estates in South Africa.

References

Notes

Bibliography

The Locomotive, August 1955, "2000hp Diesel-Electric Locomotives for Rhodesia Railways"
Vulcan Magazine, Volume 4 Number 4 Winter 1957, "Rhodesia Railways 2000hp 1Co-Co1 Diesel-Electric Locomotives", http://enuii.com/vulcan_foundry/magazine/Vol4_no4_1957/page16_s.jpg

Diesel-electric locomotives of Rhodesia
English Electric locomotives
Railway locomotives introduced in 1955
Cape gauge railway locomotives
Vulcan Foundry locomotives